A Different Beat may refer to:

A Different Beat (Gary Moore album), 1999
A Different Beat (Boyzone album), 1996
"A Different Beat" (song), 1996
"A Different Beat", a 2013 song by Little Mix from Salute